Pennock is a surname. Notable people with the surname include:
 Abraham L. Pennock (1786–1868), American abolitionist and inventor
 Adrian Pennock (born 1971), English football manager
 Alexander Mosely Pennock (1813–1876), officer of the United States Navy
 Christopher Pennock (born 1944), American actor
 Ellen Pennock (born 1988), Canadian triathlete
 Herb Pennock (1894–1948), American baseball player
 Joni Pennock, American talk show host
 Lon Pennock (1945–2020), Dutch artist
 Robert Pennock (1936–2019), Canadian politician
 Robert T. Pennock, American philosopher
 Stan Pennock (1892–1916), American football player
 Tony Pennock (born 1971), Welsh goalkeeper and coach